Walter Hartman Hodge (August 29, 1896 – July 12, 1975) was a United States district judge of the United States District Court for the District of Alaska.

Education and career

Born in Auburn, Indiana, Hodge received a bachelor of laws from University of Washington School of Law in 1919. He was a law clerk for the Washington Supreme Court from 1919 to 1920. He was in private practice of law in Wenatchee, Washington in 1921. He was a deputy prosecuting attorney of Skagit County, Washington from 1921 to 1924. He was in private practice of law in Seattle, Washington from 1925 to 1926. He was an assistant United States attorney for the District of Alaska Territory from 1926 to 1929. He was in private practice in Seattle from 1929 to 1934. He was in private practice in Cordova, Territory of Alaska from 1934 to 1954. He was a judge of the United States District Court for the District of Alaska Territory from 1954 to 1959. He was an associate justice of the Alaska Supreme Court from 1959 to 1960.

Federal judicial service

Hodge was nominated by President Dwight D. Eisenhower on January 14, 1960, to the United States District Court for the District of Alaska, to a new seat created by 72 Stat. 339. He was confirmed by the United States Senate on February 18, 1960, and received commission on February 19, 1960. He served as chief judge from 1961 to 1966. He assumed senior status on August 30, 1966. His service was terminated on July 12, 1975, due to his death.

References

Sources

External links

1896 births
1975 deaths
Justices of the Alaska Supreme Court
Alaska Territory judges
Judges of the United States District Court for the District of Alaska
People from Auburn, Indiana
United States district court judges appointed by Dwight D. Eisenhower
20th-century American judges
University of Washington School of Law alumni
Assistant United States Attorneys
Law clerks
Washington (state) lawyers
People from Skagit County, Washington
People from Cordova, Alaska